Aerialize Sydney Aerial Theatre is a Sydney based circus school and performing arts organisation, which was founded in 1999 by Shelalagh McGovern and Aimee Thomas. The organisation is run by a board of directors and is classified as a not-for-profit organisation and non-governmental organisation in Sydney - New South Wales, Australia. Aerialize runs circus classes ranging from beginner to professional skill levels and is a training space for professional and recreational circus artists.

Originally founded in the Addison road Community Centre in Marrickville, Sydney, the aerial theatre organisation took up residency in the ‘Great Hall’ before moving to Canterbury, NSW.

Performance history 
Aerialize has been a host for circus events  and performed at festivals and events such as the Sydney Fringe Festival and Adelaide Fringe Festival. Aerialize has won several awards for performances created for arts festivals. This includes winning the Sydney Fringe Festival awards for 'Outstanding Independent Artist Award' and 'Exceptional Acievement in Production and Design Award' in 2010 for the production 'Clammy Glamour from the Curio Cabinet', and 'Best Physical Theatre and Circus Award' and 'Director's Choice award' in 2015 for the production 'Aeon'.

References

External links 

 https://sydneyfringe.com/ 
 https://sydneyfringe.com/about-us/festival-archive/ 
 https://www.adelaidefestival.com.au/about/archive/ 

Australian circuses
Circus schools
Entertainment companies established in 1999
Educational institutions established in 1999
Performing arts education in Australia
1999 establishments in Australia
Performing groups established in 1999